Leo Maguire (23 June 1920 – 14 November 1979) was an Australian rules footballer who played in the VFL from 1941 to 1948 for the Richmond Football Club.

References 

 Hogan P: The Tigers Of Old, Richmond FC, Melbourne 1996

External links 
 
 

1920 births
Richmond Football Club players
Richmond Football Club Premiership players
Terang Football Club players
Australian rules footballers from Victoria (Australia)
1979 deaths
One-time VFL/AFL Premiership players